Blagoja Kuleski (born 4 October 1962) is a Macedonian football manager and former player.

Playing career

Club
Born in Prilep, SR Macedonia, back then still within Yugoslavia, Kuleski started playing in Yugoslav League for Macedonian clubs FK Pobeda, FK Vardar and FK Pelister, Serbian FK Radnički Niš, before moving to Australia, in 1992, where he played with Marconi Stallions, Melbourne Zebras, Bulleen Lions and Rockdale City Suns.

Blagoja was voted second best defender/ sweeper in 1990 in Yugoslav National League just 2 points behind Miodrag Belodedici of Red Star Belgrade who were crowned Super Cup Champions in the same year.

International
Blagoja, or Kuki, as he is better known in the football community, played the first game for Macedonia against Yugoslavia in Skopje in 1991, along the greats of Darko Pančev and Ilija Najdoski.

Managerial career
After retiring in Australia, he became a football coach managing Illawarra Lions and Bonnyrigg White Eagles. He won the Championship two consecutive years with Bonnyrigg and promoted them back into the NSW Premier League in 2009.

References

External sources
 Career in OzFootball.
 

1962 births
Living people
Sportspeople from Prilep
Association football defenders
Yugoslav footballers
Macedonian footballers
FK Pobeda players
FK Vardar players
FK Pelister players
FK Radnički Niš players
Marconi Stallions FC players
Rockdale Ilinden FC players
Yugoslav First League players
Yugoslav emigrants to Australia
Macedonian expatriate footballers
Expatriate soccer players in Australia
Macedonian expatriate sportspeople in Australia
Macedonian football managers
Bonnyrigg White Eagles FC managers
Macedonian expatriate football managers
Expatriate soccer managers in Australia
Australian Macedonian soccer managers
Macedonian emigrants to Australia